The Dewoitine D.338 was a 1930s French 22-passenger airliner built by Dewoitine.

Design and development
The D.338 was a development of the D.333 with retractable undercarriage. First flown in 1936 it had a slightly increased wingspan, and the fuselage was lengthened by 3.18 m (10 ft 5¼ in). For short routes, the aircraft could carry 22 passengers, aircraft used in the Far East were fitted with 12 luxury seats, including six that could be converted into sleeping berths.

Operational service

In the late 1930s Air France used the D.338 on its transcontinental route to French Indo-China, connecting Paris and Saigon. In 1939 the service was extended to Hong Kong.

The D.338 had a reputation for reliability and was used during World War II in the French overseas possessions. Nine aircraft that survived the war were operated on the Paris-Nice service for several months.

Variants
D.338
Main production version, 30 built.
D.342
One aircraft built in 1939 with improved lines and room for 24-passengers, powered by three 682 kW (915 hp) Gnome-Rhône 14N radial engines. Delivered to Air France in 1942.
D.620
Development of the D.338 with three supercharged 656 kW (880 hp) Gnome-Rhône 14Krsd radial engines and room for 30 passengers, one built but not delivered.

Operators

Air France
Lignes Aériennes Militaires (LAM), a Free French line, flew 338s between Beirut and Brazzaville, French Congo, during World War II.
French Air Force

Lufthansa flew seven D.338s acquired by the Germans during World War II.

The Argentine Air Force operated two Dewoitine 338s  after World War II: F-AQBT Ville de Chartres was given the military registration T 170 and F-AQBR Ville de Pau became T 171. Both planes flew until the late 1940s.

Accidents and incidents
On 2 May 1939, an Air France D.338 (registration F-ARIC) encountered sudden icing conditions during a flight from Dakar, Senegal, to Casablanca, French Morocco, and crashed near Argana, French Morocco, killing all nine people on board.

Specifications (D.338)

References

D.338
1930s French airliners
Trimotors
Low-wing aircraft
Aircraft first flown in 1936